An airport rail link is a service providing passenger rail transport from an airport to a nearby city by mainline or commuter trains, rapid transit, people mover, or light rail. Direct links operate straight to the airport terminal, while other systems require an intermediate use of people mover or shuttle bus.

Although airport rail links have been popular solutions in Europe and Japan for decades, only recently have links been constructed in North America, South America, Africa, Oceania, and the rest of Asia. Advantages for the rider include faster travel time and easy interconnection with other public transport, while authorities have benefited from less highway and parking congestion, less pollution, and additional business opportunities. Additionally, the links benefit airports by drawing in more passengers via easy access.

Connection types

Mass transit

For airports built within or close to the city limits, extending mass transit urban rail systems like rapid transit or light rail to airport terminals allows full integration with other public transport in the city, and seamless transport to all parts of town. Service frequency will be high, although travel time is a drawback as the services make many intermediate stops before reaching the city center and thus there may not be enough space for the baggage commonly carried by airport-bound passengers. Furthermore, luggage stowing facilities are not commonly found on mass transit vehicles as their primary objective is to provide high-capacity transport, as in the Airport & South Line in Sydney, Australia. A common solution involves building a separate people mover from a mass transit station to the airport terminal (see below), often using automated systems, allowing faster travel time and fare discrimination, for instance Orlyval. Because they are solely dedicated to passengers using the airport, luggage stowing facilities are more likely to appear on these systems.

The first rapid transit station to connect an airport with a mass transit system was the Berlin U-Bahn's Paradestraße station which opened in 1927 as Flughafen (Airport) and was built to provide direct access to Berlin Tempelhof Airport. The connection between Tempelhof Airport and the Berlin U-Bahn at Paradestraße was however revoked in 1937 and the preceding station Platz der Luftbrücke was instead granted that connection and remained so until Tempelhof Airport's closure in 2008. Other early examples of mass transit stations located at airports include the MBTA Blue Line's Airport station which is situated at Boston's Logan International Airport and opened for service in 1952 and rebuilt in 2004, and Cleveland RTA Rapid Transit Red Line's Cleveland Hopkins International Airport station which opened in 1968 and rebuilt in 1994, although Cleveland's rapid transit is considered the first direct airport-to-downtown rapid transit system in the Western Hemisphere.  Boston's Blue Line requires a short bus transfer from the airport rail station to the airport terminal.

Mainline rail

Dedicated railway lines to airports have become popular since the 1980s. In many cases, there are stations at the airport terminal(s) for express, intercity and commuter trains, allowing direct travel to the check-in halls. In most cases, this solution requires the building of new track, whether it is a newly built main line or a branch (spur) line from an existing main line.

A cheaper option is to open a new station on an existing line, again connected to the airport by people mover or shuttle bus (see below). While this option is commonly chosen to reduce construction costs, it is only feasible when the station is located within proximity to the airport itself. Some early examples of mainline rail stations built to serve an airport are Don Mueang Station (which opened in 1898 in Don Mueang District and which happens to be located opposite Don Mueang International Airport opened for commercial flights in 1924), Berlin Schönefeld Flughafen station (which opened in 1951 and served Berlin Schönefeld Airport until 2020 and now Terminal 5 of Berlin Brandenburg airport), Gatwick Airport railway station (of which its first incarnation was opened in 1891 to serve a nearby racecourse and was later rebuilt to directly serve Gatwick Airport in 1958), Brussels National Airport railway station (which opened in 1958 and serves Brussels Airport) and Frankfurt Airport regional station (which opened in 1972 and is one of the two railway stations that serve Frankfurt Airport).

Integration with intercity services has produced alliances where airlines sell air tickets that include the connecting rail service. Parts of Europe have seen integration of high-speed rail into airports, with domestic and international TGV services from Aéroport Charles de Gaulle 2 TGV in Paris and ICE services from Frankfurt Airport long-distance station. Because of this, many airport railway stations have received IATA codes.

Yet another option for airports is to use a high-speed "airport express" train to the city centre, especially if the airport is outside the urban area and some way from the mass transit system, but a direct downtown service is required, such as Flytoget serving Oslo Airport, Gardermoen. There are various ways this can be done: it may operate on a combination of existing and newly built mainline rail or mass transit track using a dedicated fleet of rolling stock designed for airport service. These solutions often have the drawback of lower frequencies (e.g. twice per hour), and often charge a premium fare higher than other services, but are more likely to have luxury features such as luggage racks, power outlets, Wi-Fi, and washrooms.

Most dedicated railways use mainline trains and trackage, while mass transit "airport express" lines are usually found in Asia, as in the case of the Airport Express Line in Hong Kong. Other airports, such as Heathrow Airport, are served by both express trains and mass transit. This is becoming increasingly popular in China, where several airports now have both high-speed rail and metro connections.

Shuttle

In many cases, there is no train station directly at the airport, usually because the infrastructure on which the service operates makes it impractical to build such a station. When this happens, a shuttle system is required for the last part of the journey; using either a people mover (often automated, such as AirTrain JFK in New York City) or a bus. The former allows low operating costs and higher perceived quality; the latter does not require specialized infrastructure to be built, and is often the preferred choice at smaller or low-cost airports. Shuttles do not provide a direct connection, and often involve a wait for a transfer to the next stage of the journey. Thus their market shares are often lower.

In some airports, such as San Francisco International Airport, the rail link may not serve some or all of the terminals or concourses directly; passengers using terminals that lack such connections must use a people mover or airport circulator to access their terminal. These circulators typically also serve parking lots, and sometimes airport hotels and off-site car rental locations.

Current examples

Main-line or commuter rail

Commuter rail-type service directly from a city center to the airport, without needing to change trains and sometimes without intermediate stops, such as the RER B between Aéroport Charles de Gaulle 2 TGV and Paris, or Brightline to Orlando International Airport, or Narita International Airport via the Keisei Narita Airport Line and the Narita Express.

Light rail or metro
Many cities also provide a link to their airports through their rapid transit or light rail systems, which, unlike express trains, often make numerous stops on the way to the airport. At some airports, such as O'Hare in Chicago or Hartsfield-Jackson in Atlanta, the rapid transit train only visits one terminal or concourse; passengers must transfer to an airport circulator (people mover system) to reach other terminals or concourses.

Rail to airport people mover

A hybrid solution adopted in some cities is a direct rail connection to an airport train station instead of to the airport itself. At the airport train station, the passenger switches to a people mover or other train that goes to the airport terminals. The same system can also serve passengers moving between different terminals and traveling between the terminals and car rental lots or parking areas. Several very large airports have rail stations near some terminals, but people movers are used by many to get to some other terminals. Examples: Paris Charles de Gaulle and Oakland.

Asia
Bangkok Don Mueang Airport via SRT Dark Red Line and Suvarnabhumi Airport Rail Link – Donmueang Extension.
Delhi Indira Gandhi International Airport via Airport Express line and IGI Airport metro station.
Hyderabad Rajiv Gandhi International Airport via Airport Express line (under-construction).
Jakarta Soekarno-Hatta International Airport via Soekarno–Hatta Airport Skytrain.
Seoul Gimpo International Airport via Seoul Metro Line 5 (Purple Line)

Europe
Paris Orly Airport via Orlyval, a people mover that connects to the RER network at Antony
Birmingham Airport via a pair of light-rail vehicles, connects the airport terminal to Birmingham International railway station, where the West Coast Main Line runs to Birmingham New Street, Coventry and London
Düsseldorf Airport via SkyTrain a short suspension railway that connects the terminals with the airport railway station (see above)
London Luton Airport transit via Luton DART people mover to Luton Airport Parkway railway station
Pisa Galileo Galilei International Airport: connections to Pisa's central station with Pisamover.

North America
John F. Kennedy International Airport in New York City via AirTrain JFK to Jamaica station (Long Island Rail Road trains and New York City Subway ) or Howard Beach – JFK Airport.
Miami International Airport via an airport People Mover and the Miami Intermodal Center, which is a stop for the Miami-Dade Metrorail and Tri-Rail.
Newark Liberty International Airport via AirTrain Newark and its train station, a stop for Amtrak and NJ Transit (Used by United Airlines as if it were a connecting airline.)
Oakland International Airport via BART to OAK Airport, a BART Automated Guideway Transit (AGT) system between the Coliseum Station (BART and Amtrak) and Oakland International Airport (BART station) that connect to the airport terminal buildings.
 O'Hare International Airport in Chicago via Airport Transit System to O'Hare Transfer station of Metra's North Central Service
Phoenix Sky Harbor International Airport via PHX Sky Train to 44th St/Washington station of the Valley Metro Rail system.
San Francisco International Airport to BART via the intra terminal shuttle

South America
Salgado Filho International Airport via Metro-Airport Connection to Aeroporto station of the Porto Alegre Metro.
São Paulo/Guarulhos International Airport via GRU Airport People Mover. (Opening in 2024)

Rail to bus to airport

Another common arrangement requires the passenger to take a train (or metro) to a railway station (usually) near the airport and then switch to a bus that goes to the airport terminals. Most medium and large size airports have bus connections from the inner city. This list only contains connections by bus from a railway station strongly associated, by branding or by name, with the airport.

Asia

 Cheongju International Airport via shuttle bus from Korail Cheongju Airport Station.
 Daegu International Airport via local buses from Daegu Subway Ayanggyo Station.
 Fukuoka Airport international terminal via a shuttle bus from Hakata Station.
 Hualien Airport via Hualien Transportation Bus number 1123 from Hualien Station.
 Hengchun Airport via Pingtung Bus number 8205 from Pingtung Station or Jialu Station or number 9188 from Kaohsiung Station and Xinzuoying Station.
 Hong Kong International Airport via Citybus routes S1 and S56 from Tung Chung MTR station.
Kuala Lumpur
 Subang Airport via transit bus no. 772 from  & LRT feeder bus no.
 Ninoy Aquino International Airport via shuttle bus from Taft Avenue MRT Station and Baclaran LRT Station
 Shenzhen Bao'an International Airport via bus no. M416 from Hourui Station on the Luobao Line (For current terminals)
 Shijiazhuang Zhengding International Airport via shuttle bus on dedicated roadway from Zhengding Airport Railway Station on the Beijing–Guangzhou High-Speed Railway
 Taichung International Airport via Taichung Bus number 500 from TRA Taichung TRA station or no. 156 from THSR Taichung Station and Xinwuri Station
 Tainan Airport via Shinan Bus number Red 3 from TRA Tainan Station, THSR Tainan Station or Bao'an Station, H31 from THSR Tainan Station; Tainan City Bus number 5 also provides some part-time runs via TRA Tainan Station
 Yogyakarta International Airport via Damri shuttle bus from Wojo Station of Yogyakarta International Airport Rail Link (temporary)

Europe

Aberdeen Airport, Scotland via Dyce railway station and 80 Dyce Airlink shuttle bus. In addition to linking the airport with Aberdeen, Dyce railway station also provides direct connections to Edinburgh, Glasgow and Inverness, as well as intermediate stations on those lines.
EuroAirport Basel Mulhouse Freiburg via BVB's no. 50 shuttle bus from Basel SBB railway station (Swiss exit), and via distribus bus No. 11 from SNCF's Saint-Louis railway station (French exit).
Bristol Airport, England, by frequent express bus from Bristol Temple Meads railway station
Bucharest's Henri Coandă International Airport via P.O. Aeroport Station, located about 900 m from the airport, and a shuttle bus timed to offer connections with all trains (every half-hour). Combo (bus plus train) tickets are sold under the 'Henri Coanda Express' brand.
Cardiff International Airport, Wales via Transport for Wales services and a frequent shuttle bus from Cardiff International Airport Station.
Carlisle Lake District Airport offered a connecting bus shuttle between Carlisle railway station and the terminal, with the service withdrawn during the COVID-19 pandemic.
Glasgow International Airport via shuttle bus from Paisley Gilmour Street railway station
Liverpool John Lennon Airport via regular shuttle bus services from Liverpool South Parkway
Marseille Provence Airport via free shuttles to Marseille Provence Airport train station, which is used by Transport express régional trains.
Moscow Sheremetyevo, buses and minibuses from the metro station Rechnoi Vokzal and Planernaya
Moscow Domodedovo, buses and minibuses from the metro station Domodedovskaya
Moscow Vnukovo, buses and minibuses from the metro stations Yugo-Zapadnaya and Oktyabrskaya
Moscow Zhukovsky International Airport is served by frequent buses from the terminal to Otdykh railway station.
Sandefjord Airport (and until 2016 the now closed Moss Airport) in Norway has free shuttle buses to a nearby regional railway station.
Paris Orly airport, via shuttle bus to Pont de Rungis – Aéroport d'Orly
 Rotterdam The Hague Airport via shuttle bus to Meijersplein RandstadRail station
St. Petersburg Pulkovo, minibuses from the metro station Moskovskaya
Warsaw Modlin Airport is connected by Koleje Mazowieckie, with frequent buses from the airport to Modlin railway station.

North America
Albuquerque International Sunport via a shuttle bus and the Bernalillo County/International Sunport stop for New Mexico Rail Runner Express service.
Baltimore-Washington International Airport via a shuttle bus and the BWI Rail Station, a stop for Amtrak and MARC Penn Line service.
Boston's Logan International Airport via:
 The Silver Line SL1 bus rapid transit service connecting at South Station with the MBTA Red Line (a free transfer), commuter rail and intercity buses.
 Free MassPort shuttle buses between Logan terminals and the Airport station on the MBTA Blue Line.
Chicago O' Hare International Airport via the Airport Transit System from Parking Lot E, a shuttle bus from O'Hare Metra station, and Metra's North Central Service.
Dallas/Fort Worth International Airport via two shuttle buses and the Trinity Railway Express
Dallas Love Field via a shuttle bus to DART's Inwood/Love Field Station.
Edmonton International Airport via 747 shuttle bus to the Century Park Light Rail station.
LaGuardia Airport all terminals via MTA New York City Bus:
M60 to Astoria Boulevard (New York City Subway ), 125th Street & Lexington Avenue, Harlem–125th Street (Metro-North commuter trains), 125th Street & Lenox Avenue, 125th Street & St. Nicholas Avenue and Cathedral Parkway–110th Street.
Q48 to 111th Street, Mets–Willets Point, Flushing–Main Street and Flushing–Main Street (Long Island Rail Road Port Washington Branch trains).
Additionally, the  also go to selected terminals of the LaGuardia Airport.
John F. Kennedy International Airport: served by  bus routes.
Formerly, John F. Kennedy International Airport in New York City had a shuttle bus to the Howard Beach – JFK Airport station ( and JFK Express trains). The JFK Express trains were canceled in April 1990. The shuttle bus was replaced by AirTrain JFK in 2003.
Los Angeles International Airport via a shuttle bus and the Metro Green Line or Amtrak California or FlyAway Bus
Milwaukee's General Mitchell International Airport via a shuttle bus and Amtrak.
Montréal–Pierre Elliott Trudeau International Airport via route 747 to the metro system at Lionel-Groulx and Berri-UQAM stations, as well as stops downtown along Boulevard Rene-Levesque.
Newburgh, NY – Stewart International Airport via the Leprechaun Lines commuter bus to Beacon station (Metro-North commuter trains) to New York City.
San Diego International Airport via Route 992 to Santa Fe Depot/America Plaza stations on the San Diego Trolley Blue and Orange Lines, or TROLLEY → TERMINAL shuttle bus to Middletown station on the San Diego Trolley Green Line
San Francisco International Airport via SamTrans route SFO to Millbrae station.
San Jose International Airport via a shuttle bus from the Santa Clara Caltrain station or VTA's Metro/Airport Light Rail Station.
Charles M. Schulz–Sonoma County Airport via shuttle bus to Sonoma–Marin Area Rail Transit.
Toronto Pearson International Airport via Route 900 Airport Express to Line 2 Bloor–Danforth at Kipling subway station; Route 52A Lawrence West to Line 1 Yonge-University at Lawrence and Lawrence West stations; Routes 300A Bloor-Danforth to Line 2 Bloor-Danforth line and 332 Eglinton West (overnight only) to Line 1 Yonge-University at Warden and Eglinton/Eglinton West stations respectively
 Toronto Billy Bishop Toronto City Airport (Toronto island) via shuttle bus to Line 1 Yonge–University and all GO Transit lines at Union Station
Washington Dulles International Airport via Washington Flyer or Dulles Flyer to the Wiehle – Reston East station (Washington Metro)
Orlando International Airport via Brightline (under construction, opening 2023).

Discontinued services
Formerly, John F. Kennedy International Airport in New York City had a shuttle bus to the Howard Beach – JFK Airport station ( and JFK Express trains). The JFK Express trains were canceled in April 1990. The shuttle bus was replaced by AirTrain JFK in 2003.

South America

São Paulo–Guarulhos International Airport via shuttle bus (free of charge) to CPTM Line 13 – Jade at Aeroporto-Guarulhos station. Additionally, one can use Airport Bus Service (paid shuttle bus lines) to reach many different rail stations across the city, including Tatuapé station (access to lines 3 – Red, 11 – Coral and 12 – Sapphire) and Portuguesa-Tietê station (line 1 – Blue), even though at higher fares.
Porto Alegre – Salgado Filho Airport via Porto Alegre Metro to Downtown Porto Alegre – São Leopoldo.
 Recife – Guararapes–Gilberto Freyre Airport via Recife Metro to Downtown Recife – Camaragibe.

Oceania
 Auckland, New Zealand:
Auckland Airport via Route AIR to Puhinui Station.
 Gold Coast, Australia:
Gold Coast Airport via Route 777 to Broadbeach South light rail station.

See also

Air-rail alliance
List of IATA-indexed train stations
List of airport people mover systems

References

External links 
 Articles about airport rail links on airrail NEWS

Rail link
 
Passenger rail transport